Emily Bausback (born July 24, 2002) is a Canadian retired figure skater. She is the 2020 Canadian national champion.

Career 
Bausback began learning to skate in 2005. She trains at the Champs International Skating Centre of BC at Scotia Barn in Burnaby, British Columbia, coached by Joanne McLeod.  Bausback debuted on the ISU Junior Grand Prix series in September 2016.

2019–20 season

Commencing her fourth season on the Junior Grand Prix, Bausback placed sixth at JGP United States in Lake Placid.  Selected afterward to make her senior international debut on the Challenger series, she was sixth at the 2019 CS Warsaw Cup.  Bausback's result in Poland initially earned her the season's required technical minimum scores necessary to attend ISU championship events; however, a subsequent midseason amendment by the ISU meant that she lacked the short program minimum.

Competing as a senior domestically, Bausback ranked fourth in the short program at the 2020 Canadian Championships.  She then won the free skate to take the gold medal, scoring ahead of silver medalist Alison Schumacher by 6.60 points.  Speaking afterward, she called it "the best feeling I have ever had."  Bausback was the first national ladies' champion from British Columbia since Karen Magnussen's fifth victory in 1973.

Due to Bausback lacking the senior international technical minimum in the short program, she could not be immediately assigned to one of Canada's two ladies' berths at the 2020 World Championships.  She was instead assigned, along with Schumacher and fourth-place Alicia Pineault, to compete at the 2020 Four Continents Championships in Seoul.  Bausback placed fifteenth at Four Continents, and came up short of the short program minimum. Skate Canada gave Bausback a second chance at the International Challenge Cup in The Hague, where she succeeded in gaining the minimum score. Correspondingly, she was named to the World Championship team on February 22.  However, the World Championships were subsequently cancelled as a result of the coronavirus pandemic.

2020–21 season 
After returning to training after the pandemic lockdowns, Bausback was off the ice for four weeks in the summer after breaking the second metatarsal bone in her right foot in training.  Bausback was assigned to make her Grand Prix debut at the 2020 Skate Canada International, but the event was also cancelled as a result of the pandemic.

With the pandemic making hosting in-person events difficult, the 2021 Skate Canada Challenge, the main qualifying competition for the national championships, was held virtually with athletes submitting a pre-recorded Short & Free program from various locations throughout Canada over a 6-week period.  Though winning the BC/YK Sectional Championships for the first time in her career a month earlier, Bausback, while being treated for a back injury sustained in a COVID-shortened training regimen, placed fifth in the short program, but dropped to tenth place in the free skate, finishing eighth overall.  The 2021 Canadian Championships were subsequently cancelled.

Despite her Challenge placement, and after both a strong recovery from injury and showing through Skate Canada monitoring, on February 25, Basusback was announced as one of two Ladies entries to the 2021 Worlds, along with Madeline Schizas. At the World Championships, Bausback struggled with her jumps in the short program and did not qualify for the free skating, finishing twenty-seventh overall.

2021–22 season 
Bausback was assigned to begin the season at the 2021 CS Autumn Classic International, where she placed seventh, the highest ordinal among the three Canadian women at the event. She made her Grand Prix debut at the 2021 Skate Canada International, placing eleventh. She was second among the three Canadian women at the end, 26.68 behinds Madeline Schizas but 8.69 points ahead of Alison Schumacher. Bausback deemed the overall experience "amazing", despite it not being her best performance. She was later given a second Challenger assignment, finishing seventh at the 2021 CS Cup of Austria.

Bausback finished ninth at the 2022 Canadian Championships.

She later announced her retirement from competitive figure skating.

Programs

Competitive highlights 

GP: Grand Prix; CS: Challenger Series; JGP: Junior Grand Prix

Detailed results 
Small medals for short and free programs awarded only at ISU Championships.

Senior results

Junior results

References

External links 

 

2002 births
Canadian female single skaters
Living people
Figure skaters from Vancouver